Camilaca District is one of six districts of the province Candarave in Peru.

Geography 
Other mountains are listed below:

References